The Philippine University Games, abbreviated as the UNIGAMES, is a national collegiate sports competition in the Philippines organized by the UNIGAMES, Incorporated.  Founded in 1996, it was first held at the University of St. La Salle, the founding host, in Bacolod, Philippines.  The UNIGAMES is composed of fourteen (14) sports disciplines namely Athletics, Badminton, Basketball, Football, Chess, Karatedo, Lawn Tennis, Sepak Takraw, Swimming, Table Tennis, Taekwondo, Volleyball, and Beach Volleyball. In the 2010 UNIGAMES held in Silliman University, Dumaguete, Archery was also introduced.

History
Founded in 1996 by Brother Rolando Dizon, FSC, then president of University of Saint La Salle in Bacolod City and Roger Banzuela.
Games are a Visayas-based national event. USLS serves as the main office and has hosted all annual games except in 2003 when the games were held at De La Salle-Dasmariñas (Cavite).
USLS has hosted the games nine times from 1996 to 1999, 2011, and 2004-07.
Foundation University (Dumaguete) hosted in 2000, 2002, and 2008. Central Philippine University (Iloilo) was home to the games in 2009 while Silliman University (Dumaguete) hosted the event last year.
1996 1st Unigames-Bacolod hosted by USLS. / 1997 2nd Unigames-Bacolod hosted by USLS. / 1998 3rd Unigames-Bacolod hosted by USLS. /  1999 4th Unigames-Bacolod hosted by USLS. / 2000 5th Unigames-Dumaguete hosted by FU. / 2001 6th Unigames-Bacolod hosted by USLS. / 2002 7th Unigames-Dumaguete hosted by FU. / 2003 8th Unigames-Dasmarinas hosted DLSU-D. / 2004 9th Unigames-Bacolod hosted by USLS. / 2005 10th Unigames-Bacolod hosted by USLS. / 2006 11th Unigames-Bacolod hosted by USLS. / 2007 12th Unigames-Bacolod hosted by USLS. / 2008 13th Unigames-Dumaguete hosted by FU. /

- In 2009, the 14th Unigames-Iloilo hosted by Central Philippine University.

- 2010 15th Unigames-Dumaguete hosted by SU. (47 colleges, 14 sports and Archery Exhibition Game.) / 2011 16th PSC-Unigames Roxas City hosted by CPC. (48 colleges, 14 sports.)
Colegio dela Purisima Concepcion, home to the games for 2011, is the first college to host the Unigames.
The Philippine Sports Commission has identified the Unigames as a vital link in the development of a grassroots-based national sports program and considers it the PSC’s official tertiary games. The event is now called the PSC-University Games.
In 2011, volleyball has the most number of entries with 24 teams entered in the men’s division and 18 in the women’s division. That is followed by men’s athletics and men’s basketball which have 17 teams each.
- 2012 17th Sandugo-Unigames in Bacolod hosted by USLS.
The University of the Philippines and the College of Saint Benilde have the most number of teams fielded with 15.
- Last 2014, the 19th Unigames was held in Iloilo City hosted by University of San Agustin. The first time for the school to hold the Unigames and 2nd time for the city.

2015 UNIGAMES Bacolod
The 20th edition of the Unigames was hosted by University of St. La Salle, Bacolod City. from October 24–30. 40 colleges and universities from Luzon, Visayas and Mindanao participated in the 13 sporting disciplines of the games.

These were the winners of the recently concluded games.

Footnotes

External links
Official website

Student sport in the Philippines